Ballycullen (Irish: Baile Uí Chuillinn) is a townland and suburb of Dublin, Ireland.

Ballycullen is a townland in the civil parish of Tallaght, located in Dublin 16 and Dublin 24. The Ballycullen Road is the historical divide between Dublin 24 and Dublin 16. The estates which comprise Ballycullen exist on both sides of the road, with most of Ballycullen existing in D24.
 
Ballycullen (D24), Knocklyon (D16), Tallaght (D24) and Firhouse (D24) all adjoin each other and the defining borders are Firhouse Road, Ballycullen Road, Old Court Road, Dale Tree Road and Gunny Hill. The area is served by Dublin Bus routes 15, 49 and 65b.

References

Towns and villages in South Dublin (county)